Kulanen Ikyo is a Nigerian composer and sound editor. He is best known for his work on the films Lionheart, The CEO, and October 1 and television series Blood Sisters.

Life and career
Kulanen was born in Benue State, Nigeria and graduated from the University of Jos with a Physics degree. He made his debut as a composer in the historical fiction film October 1, directed by Kunle Afolayan.  The movie won the best sound editor award at the 2015 Africa Magic Viewers Choice Awards.

Filmography

As Composer
 October 1 (2014)
 Road to Yesterday (2015)
 Henna (2015)
 The CEO (2016)
 Okafor's Law (2016)
 Lionheart (2018)
 If I Am President (2018)
 4th Republic (2019)
 Oloture (2019)
 Blood Sisters (2022 series)

Awards and nominations

References

External links
 

Living people
Nigerian male musicians
Nigerian composers
Year of birth missing (living people)
University of Jos alumni
Nigerian sound editors